Hong Seung-yeon (born 17 April 1992) is an inactive South Korean female tennis player.

She has career-high WTA rankings of 536 in singles, achieved on 22 May 2017, and 407 in doubles, reached on 21 September 2015.

Hong made her WTA Tour main-draw debut at the 2010 Hansol Korea Open doubles tournament where she partnered Han Sung-hee, losing in the first round.

ITF Circuit finals

Singles: 2 (1 title, 1 runner-up)

Doubles: 14 (7 titles, 7 runner-ups)

External links
 
 

1992 births
Living people
South Korean female tennis players
21st-century South Korean women